Zamlača may refer to:

 Zamlača, Sisak-Moslavina County, a village near Dvor, Croatia
 Zamlača, Varaždin County, a village near Vidovec, Croatia